Lecithocera palmata is a moth in the family Lecithoceridae. It was described by Chun-Sheng Wu and You-Qiao Liu in 1993. It is found in Hainan, China.

The wingspan is 16–17 mm. The species resembles Lecithocera pelomorpha and Lecithocera perpensa.

References

Moths described in 1993
palmata
Moths of Asia